Rodney McMillian (born 1969, in Columbia, South Carolina) is an artist based in Los Angeles. McMillian is a Professor of Sculpture at the UCLA School of Arts and Architecture at the University of California, Los Angeles.

McMillian holds a BA in Foreign Affairs from the University of Virginia. He studied art at the School of the Art Institute of Chicago and the Skowhegan School of Painting and Sculpture, and received a Master of Fine Arts degree from the California Institute of the Arts in 2002.

McMillian’s work has been exhibited at the UCLA Hammer Museum and the Museum of Contemporary Art, Los Angeles, the Studio Museum in Harlem New York, the Herning Art Museum in Denmark, the Royal Academy in London, Boston's Institute of Contemporary Art and the Whitney. His work features in collections including the Harald Falckenberg Collection and the Saatchi Gallery. His 2012 solo exhibition Prospect Ave was shown at Maccarone in New York and featured found-object sculpture, site-specific installation, video, and paintings.

References

External links 
 Susanne Vielmetter Los Angeles Projects; Rodney McMillian bio, press releases und works General information on Rodney McMillian
 The Saatchi Gallery
 A Review of His Work at Artcritical.com

1969 births
African-American contemporary artists
American contemporary artists
American contemporary painters
20th-century American painters
American male painters
21st-century American painters
Living people
School of the Art Institute of Chicago alumni
University of Virginia alumni
20th-century African-American painters
21st-century African-American artists
20th-century American male artists
Skowhegan School of Painting and Sculpture alumni